Trivicum is the ancient Hirpini and Samnium town nowadays called Trevico.

Horace's visit
The Roman poet Horace mentions Trivicum in his well-known account of a journey in 37 BC along the Appian Way from Rome to Brindisi:

'From there (Beneventum) Apulia began to show her familiar mountains to me, which the Atabulus wind scorches and which we would never have crawled over, had not a neighbouring villa in Trivicum welcomed us, not without eye-watering smoke, as the fireplace was burning damp branches along with their leaves.'

References 

Geography of Italy